ROCS Chang Chien (張騫, PFG2-1109) is the seventh of eight Taiwanese-built s based on the United States .

Construction and career 
Laid down in June 1996 and launched in April 1997, Chang Chien was commissioned in November, 1998. All of these Taiwanese frigates have the length of the later Oliver Hazard Perry-class vessels, but have a different weapon and electronics fit.

Like her sister ships, Chang Chien was built under license by China SB Corp. at Kaohsiung City, Taiwan, ROC.

As of 2005, Chang Chien is homeported at Tso-Ying naval base.

Namesake 
Chang Chien is named after Chang Chien (張騫) (195 BCE - 114 BCE), who served as an emissary to the nation-states in today's Central Asia and later as a general for the Han Dynasty. He was famous for not-giving up his emissary mission even when captured by Xiongnu and forced to live among them for many years. Chang Chien was also instrumental for eventual Han conquest and colonization of the region now known as Xinjiang.

Gallery

See also

Notes

References
Saunders, Stephen. Jane's Fighting Ships 2002–2003. Coulsdon, UK: Jane's Information Group, 2002. .

Cheng Kung-class frigates
Ships built in the Republic of China
1997 ships
Frigates of the Republic of China